Busenje (Hungarian: Káptalanfalva) is a village in Serbia. It is situated in the Sečanj municipality, in the Central Banat District, Vojvodina province. The village has a Hungarian ethnic majority (85.10%) and its population numbering 64 people (2011 census). The village was heavily damaged in the April 2005 floods, when the Tamiš river flooded the village, and almost half the population left the village.

Historical population

1961: 224
1971: 185
1981: 141
1991: 119
2002: 94

See also
List of places in Serbia
List of cities, towns and villages in Vojvodina

References
Slobodan Ćurčić, Broj stanovnika Vojvodine, Novi Sad, 1996.

Populated places in Serbian Banat